Paride Milianti (born 21 August 1934) is an Italian retired alpine skier. He competed at the 1956, 1960, and 1964 Winter Olympics in the downhill, slalom, and giant slalom events with the best results of eighth place in each the slalom and giant slalom in 1960.

References

External links
 

1934 births
Living people
Alpine skiers at the 1956 Winter Olympics
Alpine skiers at the 1960 Winter Olympics
Alpine skiers at the 1964 Winter Olympics
Olympic alpine skiers of Italy
Italian male alpine skiers
Italian alpine skiing coaches